Spaghetti is a long, thin, solid, cylindrical pasta. It is a staple food of traditional Italian cuisine. Like other pasta, spaghetti is made of milled wheat, water, and sometimes enriched with vitamins and minerals. Italian spaghetti is typically made from durum-wheat semolina. Usually the pasta is white because refined flour is used, but whole wheat flour may be added. Spaghettoni is a thicker form of spaghetti, while spaghettini is a thinner form. Capellini is a very thin spaghetti, sometimes known colloquially as "angel hair pasta".

Originally, spaghetti was notably long, but shorter lengths gained in popularity during the latter half of the 20th century and now it is most commonly available in  lengths. A variety of pasta dishes are based on it and it is frequently served with tomato sauce, meat or vegetables.

Etymology 
Spaghetti is the plural form of the Italian word spaghetto, which is a diminutive of spago, meaning 'thin string' or 'twine'.

History 

The first written record of pasta comes from the Talmud in the 5th century AD and refers to dried pasta that could be cooked through boiling, which was conveniently portable. Some historians think that Arabs introduced pasta to Europe during a conquest of Sicily. In the West, it may have first been worked into long, thin forms in Sicily around the 12th century, as the Tabula Rogeriana of Muhammad al-Idrisi attested, reporting some traditions about the Sicilian kingdom.

The popularity of spaghetti spread throughout Italy after the establishment of spaghetti factories in the 19th century, enabling the mass production of spaghetti for the Italian market.

In the United States around the end of the 19th century, spaghetti was offered in restaurants as Spaghetti Italienne (which likely consisted of noodles cooked past al dente, and a mild tomato sauce flavored with easily found spices and vegetables such as cloves, bay leaves, and garlic) and it was not until decades later that it came to be commonly prepared with oregano or basil.

Ingredients
Spaghetti is made from ground grain (flour) and water. Whole-wheat and multigrain spaghetti are also available.

Production

Fresh spaghetti 

At its simplest, imitation spaghetti can be formed using no more than a rolling pin and a knife. A home pasta machine simplifies the rolling and makes the cutting more uniform. Although, of course cutting sheets produces pasta with a rectangular rather than a cylindrical cross-section and the result is a variant of fettuccine. Some pasta machines have a spaghetti attachment with circular holes that extrude spaghetti or shaped rollers that form cylindrical noodles.

Spaghetti can be made by hand by manually rolling a ball of dough on a surface to make a long sausage shape. The ends of the sausage are pulled apart to make a long thin sausage. The ends are brought together and the loop pulled to make two long sausages. The process is repeated until the pasta is sufficiently thin. The pasta knobs at each end are cut off leaving many strands which may be hung up to dry.

Fresh spaghetti would normally be cooked within hours of being formed. Commercial versions of fresh spaghetti are manufactured.

Dried spaghetti 
The bulk of dried spaghetti is produced in factories using auger extruders. While essentially simple, the process requires attention to detail to ensure that the mixing and kneading of the ingredients produces a homogeneous mix, without air bubbles. The forming dies have to be water cooled to prevent spoiling of the pasta by overheating. Drying of the newly formed spaghetti has to be carefully controlled to prevent strands sticking together, and to leave it with sufficient moisture so that it is not too brittle. Packaging for protection and display has developed from paper wrapping to plastic bags and boxes.

Preparation 

Fresh or dry spaghetti is cooked in a large pot of salted, boiling water and then drained in a colander.

In Italy, spaghetti is generally cooked al dente (Italian for "to the tooth"), fully cooked but still firm to the bite. It may also be cooked to a softer consistency.

Spaghettoni is a thicker spaghetti which takes more time to cook. Spaghettini is a thinner form which takes less time to cook. Capellini is a very thin form of spaghetti (it is also called "angel hair spaghetti" or "angel hair pasta") which cooks very quickly.

Utensils used in spaghetti preparation include the spaghetti scoop and spaghetti tongs.

Serving

Italian cuisine 

An emblem of Italian cuisine, spaghetti is frequently served with tomato sauce, which may contain various herbs (especially oregano and basil), olive oil, meat, or vegetables. Other spaghetti preparations include amatriciana or carbonara. Grated hard cheeses, such as Pecorino Romano, Parmesan and Grana Padano, are often sprinkled on top.

International cuisine 

In some countries, spaghetti is sold in cans/tins with sauce.

In the United States, it is sometimes served with chili con carne. Unlike in Italy, in other countries spaghetti is often served with Bolognese sauce.

In the Philippines, a popular variant is the Filipino spaghetti, which is distinctively sweet with the tomato sauce sweetened with banana ketchup or sugar. It typically uses a large amount of giniling (ground meat), sliced hotdogs, and cheese. The dish dates back to the period between the 1940s to the 1960s. During the American Commonwealth Period, a shortage of tomato supplies in the Second World War forced the development of the banana ketchup. Spaghetti was introduced by the Americans and was tweaked to suit the local Filipino predilection for sweet dishes.

Sapaketti phat khi mao (Spaghetti fried drunken noodle style) is a popular dish in Thai cuisine.

Spaghetti is a main part of laksa Johor, a specialty from Johor, Malaysia.

Spaghetti dishes 

 Spaghetti aglio e olio – ("spaghetti with garlic and oil" in Italian), a traditional Italian pasta dish coming from Naples.
 Spaghetti alla puttanesca – (literally "spaghetti whore-style" in Italian), a tangy, somewhat salty Italian pasta dish invented in the mid-20th century. The ingredients are typical of Southern Italian cuisine: tomatoes, olive oil, olives, capers and garlic.
 Spaghetti alla Nerano – from the village of Nerano, near Naples. With fried zucchinis and a local variant of provolone.
 Spaghetti alle vongole – Italian for "spaghetti with clams", it is very popular throughout Italy, especially its central regions, including Rome and further south in Campania (where it is part of traditional Neapolitan cuisine).
 Spaghetti and meatballs – an Italian-American dish that usually consists of spaghetti, tomato sauce and meatballs.
 Spaghetti Bolognese – spaghetti with Ragù (minced beef and tomato sauce).

Consumption 
By that year, Italy produced 1,432,990 tons of spaghetti, of which 74,000 were exported, and had a production capacity of 3 million tons.

Nutrition 

Pasta provides carbohydrates, along with some protein, iron, dietary fiber, potassium and B vitamins. Pasta prepared with whole wheat grain provides more dietary fiber than that prepared with degermed flour.

Records 

In popular culture
The term Spaghetti Western was used by American critics and those in other countries because most of the Western movies made in Europe were produced and directed by Italians.

The BBC television program Panorama featured a hoax program about the spaghetti harvest in Switzerland on April Fools' Day, 1957.

Spaghetti code means badly written code.

See also 

 List of pasta
 Spaghetti alla chitarra
 Spaghetti sandwich
 Spaghetti squash
 Spaghettieis
 SpaghettiOs

References

Bibliography

Further reading

External links

 
Types of pasta
Pasta
Italian cuisine
Italian words and phrases